Liga Deportiva Universitaria de Quito's 2017 season was the club's 87th year of existence, the 64th year in professional football, and the 56th in the top level of professional football in Ecuador.

Club

Personnel
President: Guillermo Romero
Honorary President: Rodrigo Paz
President of the Executive Commission: Esteban Paz
President of the Football Commission: Edwin Ripalda
Vice-President of the Football Commission: Patricio Torres
Sporting manager: Santiago Jácome

Coaching staff
Manager: Pablo Repetto
Assistant manager: Óscar Quagliatta, Franklin Salas
Physical trainer: Roberto Teixeira
Goalkeeper trainer: Luis Preti

Kits
Supplier: Umbro
Sponsor(s): Chevrolet, Discover, DirecTV, Roland

Breast cancer awareness month kit

L.D.U. Quito wore this uniform in October.

Squad information

Note: Caps and goals are of the national league and are current as of the beginning of the season.

Winter transfers

Summer transfers

Competitions

Pre-season friendlies

Serie A

The 2017 season was Liga's 56th season in the Serie A and their 16th consecutive. The format was identical to the previous season.

First stage

Results summary

Results by round

Second stage

Results summary

Results by round

2018 Copa Sudamericana playoff

LDU Quito won 5–4 on aggregate.

CONMEBOL Sudamericana

L.D.U. Quito qualified to the 2017 CONMEBOL Sudamericana—their 10th participation in the continental tournament—as the 5th place of the 2016 Serie A. They entered the competition in the first stage.

CONMEBOL Sudamericana squad

1.Aníbal Chalá replaced Rubén Olivera for the second stage.
2.Jonathan González replaced Jairo Padilla for the second stage.
3.Lucas Tagliapietra replaced Gabriel Cevallos for the second stage.
4. Alejandro Villalva left the club.
5. Felipe Rodríguez left the club.
6. Fernando Guerrero left the club.
Source:

First stage

LDU Quito won 4–3 on aggregate and advanced to the second stage.

Second stage

Tied 1–1 on aggregate, LDU Quito won on penalties and advanced to the round of 16 (Match F).

Round of 16

Tied 2–2 on aggregate, Fluminense won on away goals and advanced to the quarterfinals.

Player statistics

Note: Players in italics left the club mid-season.

Team statistics

References

External links
  

2017
Ecuadorian football clubs 2017 season